KRVB is a commercial radio station located in Boise, Idaho, broadcasting to the Boise, Idaho, area on 94.9 FM.  KRVB airs an adult album alternative music format branded as "The River" (a reference to Boise and nearby Snake Rivers).

History

Full service (1975-1984) 
94.9 was launched as KFXD-FM in 1975 with the FM feed of KFXD (AM). It was initially branded as XD-FM 95 by 1979 with a full service Top 40 radio format and news/talk. KFXD-FM was syndicated with Drake-Chenault's XT-40.

Top 40/CHR (1984-1993) 
In 1984, it was rebranded to KF95 and flipped to a full-time Top 40 format to compete with the then CHR station Magic 92 (KBBK), and the later rebranded 92 Kiss FM (KIYS) until it was dropped in 1990 when it switched to country. Upon the launch of KF95, the logo and the branding was being shared by the Sacramento, California radio station FM102 (KSFM), and Atlanta, Georgia's Z-93 (WZGC).

Adult contemporary (1993-1995) 
A new CHR rival, Magic 93.1 (KZMG), first launched in 1991. It competed directly with KF95 until 1993, when KFXD-FM moved to an Adult Contemporary direction as The Legend, KF95.

Adult album alternative (1995-present) 
After rebranding as Mix 95 in 1995, the station format changed to Adult Album Alternative. At one point, the station restored the KF95 moniker, positioned as The Music Difference. The call letters were changed to KFXJ in 1998, as it was no longer co-owned with KFXD-AM.  

In 2000, the station rebranded as 94.9 The River with new call letters KRVB.

Journal Communications and the E. W. Scripps Company announced on July 30, 2014, that the two companies would merge to create a new broadcast company under the E. W. Scripps Company name that will own the two companies' broadcast properties, including KRVB. The transaction is slated to be completed in 2015, pending shareholder and regulatory approvals.

In January 2018, Scripps announced that it would sell all of its radio stations. In August 2018, Lotus Communications announced that it would acquire Scripps' Boise & Tucson clusters for $8 million. The sale was completed on December 12.

References

External links
Official Website

RVB
Adult album alternative radio stations in the United States
Radio stations established in 1975
1975 establishments in Idaho
Lotus Communications stations